Mackey is a town in Barton Township, Gibson County, Indiana, United States. With a population of 106 at the 2010 census, Mackey is the smallest incorporated community in Gibson County and one of the smallest incorporated communities in the state.

History
A post office was established at Mackey in 1885. The town was likely named for O. J. Mackey, a railroad official.

Geography
Mackey is located at  (38.253120, -87.392053).

Demographics

2010 census
As of the census of 2010, there were 106 people, 45 households, and 28 families living in the town. The racial makeup of the town was 98.1% White and 1.9% from two or more races.

There were 45 households, of which 28.9% had children under the age of 18 living with them, 46.7% were married couples living together, 8.9% had a female householder with no husband present, 6.7% had a male householder with no wife present, and 37.8% were non-families. 31.1% of all households were made up of individuals, and 11.1% had someone living alone who was 65 years of age or older. The average household size was 2.36 and the average family size was 2.86.

The median age in the town was 37.5 years. 19.8% of residents were under the age of 18; 12.2% were between the ages of 18 and 24; 22.6% were from 25 to 44; 31.1% were from 45 to 64; and 14.2% were 65 years of age or older. The gender makeup of the town was 50.9% male and 49.1% female.

2000 census
As of the census of 2000, there were 142 people, 60 households, and 40 families living in the town. The racial makeup of the town was 97.89% White, 2.11% from other races. Hispanic or Latino of any race were 2.11% of the population.

There were 60 households, out of which 30.0% had children under the age of 18 living with them, 58.3% were married couples living together, 8.3% had a female householder with no husband present, and 31.7% were non-families. 28.3% of all households were made up of individuals, and 13.3% had someone living alone who was 65 years of age or older. The average household size was 2.37 and the average family size was 2.95.

In the town, the population was spread out, with 24.6% under the age of 18, 3.5% from 18 to 24, 30.3% from 25 to 44, 19.7% from 45 to 64, and 21.8% who were 65 years of age or older. The median age was 38 years. For every 100 females, there were 79.7 males. For every 100 females age 18 and over, there were 84.5 males.

The median income for a household in the town was $33,750, and the median income for a family was $44,375. Males had a median income of $38,750 versus $21,875 for females. The per capita income for the town was $14,282. There were 6.5% of families and 8.0% of the population living below the poverty line, including 10.0% of under eighteens and none of those over 64.

Schools
Mackey and the easternmost half of Gibson County is served by the East Gibson School Corporation which currently operates five schools:

Wood Memorial High School (9-12)
Wood Memorial Junior High School (7-8)
Oakland City Elementary School (PK-6)
Francisco Elementary School (K-6)
Barton Township Elementary School (K-6)

Former schools
In 1968 Mackey High School consolidated with Francisco and Oakland City High Schools to form Waldo J. Wood Memorial Jr/Sr High School located in Oakland City.

Major highways
   Interstate 69
   State Road 57
   State Road 168

References

Towns in Gibson County, Indiana
Towns in Indiana
Evansville metropolitan area
Communities of Southwestern Indiana